Zachary Samuel Dawson (born 22 February 1986) is a former Australian rules football player who played with the Hawthorn Football Club, St Kilda Football Club and Fremantle Football Club in the Australian Football League. In March 2019, he was appointed as Manager of the Carlton Football Club's Next Generation Academy program.

AFL career

Hawthorn 

Dawson was recruited from Calder Cannons with pick no. 41 in the 2003 AFL Draft.

Dawson's first game for Hawthorn was in 2005. He played the first eight games of 2006, until being dropped from the team, returning for four games in Rounds 15–18.

The key position prospect was being groomed for the full-back role during a 12-game stint in 2006, but his confidence received a battering after Anthony Rocca kicked eight goals on him in round two of that year. He did however, keep Geelong's Kent Kingsley goalless the following week.

Dawson failed to play a senior game for Hawthorn in 2007 and 2008. He spent the time playing for Box Hill, on one occasion he kicked eight goals. Dawson was delisted from Hawthorn after the end of the 2008 season.

St Kilda 

Dawson was drafted with pick 13 by St Kilda in the 2008 rookie draft. He was promoted to the senior team for Round 1 in 2009 due to injuries to other players and played the first 16 games in an undefeated side until being reported for rough conduct in Round 16 and suspended for two matches.

Dawson played in 20 of 22 matches in the 2009 home and away rounds in which St Kilda qualified in first position for the finals, winning the club's third minor premiership.

St Kilda played off in the 2009 AFL Grand Final after qualifying and preliminary finals wins. Dawson played in the grand final in which St Kilda were defeated by 12 points.

Dawson played 20 games in 2010, and was named St Kilda's player of the finals series (jointly with Lenny Hayes). As of the end of the 2010 season, Dawson had played in seven finals matches including three grand finals.

Fremantle

In November 2011, Dawson left the Saints after deciding against signing a new contract with the club. He moved to Fremantle Dockers for the 2012 season, reuniting him with former St Kilda coach Ross Lyon.

Zac Dawson's ability to organise his teammates has been crucial in Ross Lyon's 'defensive chain' at St Kilda and now at Fremantle. In 2013 Dawson played in his 4th losing grand final as Fremantle made it to their first ever premiership decider.

In 2014 Dawson's form peaked in the finals, where he was named Fremantle's Player of the Finals along with Cameron Sutcliffe.  He extended his contract until the end of the 2017 season in March 2015. However he would only play five AFL games in 2015, with a series of groin injuries delaying his start to the season, and then fracturing his thumb in his first game back for Peel in the West Australian Football League.

Statistics

|- 
| 2004 ||  || 26
| 0 || — || — || — || — || — || — || — || — || — || — || — || — || — || — || 0
|-
| 2005 ||  || 26
| 2 || 0 || 0 || 8 || 12 || 20 || 5 || 4 || 0.0 || 0.0 || 4.0 || 6.0 || 10.0 || 2.5 || 2.0 || 0
|-  
| 2006 ||  || 26
| 12 || 0 || 0 || 35 || 68 || 103 || 37 || 24 || 0.0 || 0.0 || 2.9 || 5.7 || 8.6 || 3.1 || 2.0 || 0
|-
| 2007 ||  || 26
| 0 || — || — || — || — || — || — || — || — || — || — || — || — || — || — || 0
|-  
| 2008 ||  || 26
| 0 || — || — || — || — || — || — || — || — || — || — || — || — || — || — || 0
|-
| 2009 ||  || 43
| 23 || 2 || 1 || 127 || 157 || 284 || 136 || 39 || 0.1 || 0.0 || 5.5 || 6.8 || 12.4 || 5.9 || 1.7 || 0
|-  
| 2010 ||  || 6
| 20 || 1 || 3 || 99 || 122 || 221 || 89 || 22 || 0.0 || 0.2 || 5.0 || 6.1 || 11.0 || 4.4 || 1.1 || 0
|-
| 2011 ||  || 6
| 20 || 1 || 1 || 61 || 153 || 214 || 80 || 25 || 0.0 || 0.0 || 3.0 || 7.6 || 10.7 || 4.0 || 1.2 || 0
|- 
| 2012 ||  || 3
| 18 || 2 || 2 || 60 || 107 || 167 || 50 || 21 || 0.1 || 0.1 || 3.3 || 5.9 || 9.3 || 2.8 || 1.2 || 0
|-
| 2013 ||  || 3
| 24 || 0 || 0 || 60 || 158 || 218 || 72 || 40 || 0.0 || 0.0 || 2.5 || 6.6 || 9.1 || 3.0 || 1.7 || 0
|-  
| 2014 ||  || 3
| 22 || 1 || 0 || 60 || 162 || 222 || 77 || 26 || 0.0 || 0.0 || 2.7 || 7.4 || 10.1 || 3.5 || 1.2 || 0
|-
| 2015 ||  || 3
| 5 || 0 || 0 || 10 || 35 || 45 || 13 || 6 || 0.0 || 0.0 || 2.0 || 7.0 || 9.0 || 2.6 || 1.2 || 0
|-  
| 2016 ||  || 3
| 18 || 0 || 0 || 44 || 111 || 155 || 52 || 33 || 0.0 || 0.0 || 2.4 || 6.2 || 8.6 || 2.9 || 1.8 || 0
|-
| 2017 ||  || 3
| 2 || 0 || 0 || 3 || 5 || 8 || 2 || 5 || 0.0 || 0.0 || 3.4 || 6.6 || 10.0 || 3.7 || 1.5 || 0
|- class="sortbottom"
! colspan=3| Career
! 166 !! 7 !! 7 !! 567 !! 1090 !! 1657 !! 613 !! 245 !! 0.0 !! 0.0 !! 3.4 !! 6.6 !! 10.0 !! 3.7 !! 1.5 !! 0
|}

Honours and achievements
Team
 Minor premiership: 2009
 Minor premiership: 2015
 WAFL premiership player: 2017

References

External links

1986 births
Living people
Hawthorn Football Club players
St Kilda Football Club players
Fremantle Football Club players
Calder Cannons players
Doutta Stars Football Club players
Australian rules footballers from Victoria (Australia)
Perth Football Club players
Peel Thunder Football Club players
People educated at Penleigh and Essendon Grammar School